Nude Beach are an American punk rock band formed in 2008. The band has released albums on Mandible Records, Other Music Recording Co., and Don Giovanni Records.

Discography

Full Length Records

EPs

References

External links
 
 

Don Giovanni Records artists
Musical groups established in 2009
American musical trios
Pop punk groups from New York (state)